Carolina Fieldhouse was a 3,200 seat multi-purpose arena in Columbia, South Carolina. It opened in 1927. It was home to the University of South Carolina Gamecocks basketball teams until it was destroyed by a fire in 1968. Its games were then played at the Carolina Coliseum.

References

College basketball venues in the United States
Sports venues in Richland County, South Carolina
Defunct college basketball venues in the United States
Defunct indoor arenas in the United States
South Carolina Gamecocks men's basketball
1927 establishments in South Carolina
Sports venues completed in 1927
Sports venues demolished in 1968
Basketball venues in South Carolina
Indoor arenas in South Carolina